Frunzeni may refer to:

 Frunzeni, a village in Lunca, Mureș
 Frunzeni, a village in Costișa Commune, Neamţ County, Romania

See also
Frunză (disambiguation)
Frunzeni (disambiguation)